"Time, Time" is the title track of a 1967 album by Ed Ames. The song is also known as "Tu As Beau Sourire" (You Have a Beautiful Smile).  The music was composed by Baselli & Canfora with lyrics by Michel Jourdan.  In English the lyrics were written by Mort Shuman.  On the 'Billboard Hot 100, "Time, Time" peaked at number sixty-one, and was Ames' second of three number ones on the Easy Listening chart in the US, when it topped the chart in June 1967.

See also
Time, Time
List of number-one adult contemporary singles of 1967 (U.S.)

References

Ed Ames songs
1967 singles
1967 songs